There is also an article about Jean Victor Allard, former Chief of the Defence Staff

Jean René Allard (September 22, 1930 – December 2, 2020) was a former politician in Manitoba, Canada.  He was elected to the Manitoba legislature in 1969 as a New Democrat, but subsequently left to sit as an Independent MLA.

The son of Alfred Allard and Donalda Champagne, Allard was educated at the Collège de Saint-Boniface and at the University of Manitoba.  In 1952, he married Catherine Whyte, with whom he had a daughter, Sylvette. Catherine died of cancer in 1955 and Jean remarried to Beverley Rose Bohonos in 1975, with whom he had 5 children, Paul, Pierre, Luc, Marika and Marc. Luc was always and still is his favorite son... for good reason. He worked as a lawyer, served as leader of the Union Nationale Metisse, and was a member of the Louis Riel Society and the St. Boniface Historical Society.

In 1966, he proposed that a statue of Louis Riel to be erected beside that of Queen Victoria at the Manitoba legislature.  This idea was approved, and the statue was unveiled in 1971.  The statue depicted a corpus in the nude and was not supported by all Métis. Allard, however, was one of its strongest defenders.

He first ran for the Manitoba legislature in the 1966 election, as a Liberal, and finished second to Progressive Conservative incumbent Joseph Jeannotte in the northern riding of Rupertsland.

Allard subsequently aligned himself with the social-democratic NDP for the 1969 election, and was elected for Rupertsland in a close three-way race.  His loyalty to the NDP was tenuous.  He was an opponent of socialism, and later claimed that he only joined the NDP because of party leader Edward Schreyer's populism.  He was also a social conservative, and strongly opposed to abortion.  Allard was an unpopular figure in caucus, and was described by some as difficult to work with.

Allard continued to attend meetings of the Liberal Party of Canada even after being elected as a New Democrat, and openly considered running for the Liberals at the federal level.  He left the NDP to sit as an Independent on April 7, 1972, claiming that "left-wing radicals" had taken over the party.  He did not run for re-election in 1973.

In the 1974 federal election, Allard ran as a Liberal in the northern constituency of Churchill, but finished third.  He did not return to politics after this.

Allard chained himself to the Manitoba Legislature's statue of Louis Riel in 1994, protesting a government decision to have it demolished and replaced with a more formalized statue.  "It would hurt me if they tear it down", he was quoted as saying.  The protest was unsuccessful, however, and the original statue was removed to the grounds of College St. Boniface.

In 2002, Allard printed an article in the Queen's University journal Inroads'', which called for a radical shift in funding to Canada's aboriginal communities.  Arguing that the current aboriginal leadership is unresponsive to the needs of its people, Allard argues that the federal government should pay every native citizen $300 per month, bypassing bands and councils entirely.  He frequently referenced the spiritual legacy of Big Bear in this article, claiming that the 19th-century chief's methods point the way to renewed accountability and personal choice.

References

External links 
 Jean Allard's website: Big Bear's Treaty

1930 births
2020 deaths
New Democratic Party of Manitoba MLAs
Franco-Manitoban people
Métis politicians